Raavan is an Indian mythological drama series aired on Zee TV from 18 November 2006 to 16 November  2008, based on the life of the primary antagonist of the epic Ramayana, Ravana.

Cast 

 Narendra Jha - Dasanan Ravan (10-headed Goad King of Lanka)
 Jay Soni - Teenage Dasanan Ravan
 Kavin Dave - Teenage Kumbhkaran
 Meghan Jadhav- Teenage Vibhishan
 Ravee Gupta - Kaikesi (Dasanan, Kumbhkaran, Vibishian, Shrupnakha, Chandranakha's mother, Maharashi Vishrava's wife)
 Rajendra Gupta - Sumali (Malyavan's brother & Dasanan's grandfather)
 Arun Mathur - Malyavan (Sumali's elder brother)
 Sunil Singh - Prahasta (Sumali's son)
 Mahendra Ghule - Akampana (Sumali's son)
 Sanjeev Siddharth - Dand (Sumali's Son)
  Sanjeev Tyagi - Dhumraksh (Sumali's son)
 Shailendra Shrivastava - Mayasura (Mandodari's Father)
 Manasi Salvi / Rashami Desai - Mandodari (Queen of Lanka & Dasanan Ravan's wife)
 Shashi Sharma - Tadka (Marecch & Subahu's mother)
 Gajendra Chauhan - Maharaj Dasharath (King of Ayodhya)
 Diwakar Pundir - Shri Ram (Avatar of Bhagwan Vishnu/Husband of Sita)
 Chirag Ruia - Child Lord Ram
Paras Arora - Child Lakshman 
 Ujjwal Rana - Sumitranandan Lakshman (Younger brother of Shri Ram, Bharat & twin brother Shatrughna)
 Namrata Thapa - Janaknandini Sita (Wife of Shri Ram)
 Shweta Dadhich - Kaushalya (Shri Ram's mother & Dasharath's first wife)
Sonia Kapoor - Kaikeyi (Bharat's mother & Dasharath's second wife)
Yashodhan Rana - Shiva
 Amit Pachori - Hanuman (Avatar of Kalashpati Shankar (Shiva) & Shri Ram's true devotee)
 Shahbaz Khan - Mahishmati Raj Kartavirya Sahastrarjun/Patalok Raj Ahiravan (Double Role/Dasanan Ravan's Cousin)
Richa Soni - Chitrangada (Ravan's second wife) 
 Ali Hassan - Patalok Raj Mahiravan (Brother of Ahiravan/Dasanan Ravan's Cousin)
 Nimai Bali- Bali (Sugriv's twin brother & Devraj Indra's son)
 Vinod Kapoor - Maharashi Gautam/Maharashi Agustya (Double Role/Ahilya's husband)
 Pawan Chopra - Kuber (Dasanan Ravan's elder brother)
Malini Kapoor - Devayanai (Sage Shukracharya's daughter) 
 Anjali Rana - Manorama (Ravan's second wife's best friend)
 Ratan Rajput / Divya Dwivedi - Chandernakha (Dasanan Ravan's sister)
 Pankaj Bhatia- Shrihari Vishnu (Preserver of the Universe)
 Radhe Krishna Dutta- Rishi Vishrava (Father of Dasanan Ravan, Kumbhkaran, Vibishian, Chandranakha)
 Tarakesh Chauhan- Guru Vashistha
 Anil Yadav - Vishwamitra
Sanjay Swaraj - Parashurama
 Ranjeev Verma -  Virupaksh (Malyavan’s son) 
 Sunil Nagar - Jamdagni (Father of Parashurama]
 Jassi Singh -  Mali (Younger brother of Malyavan and Sumali, killed by Shrihari Vishnu)
 Sandeep Bhanushali - Vibhishana
 Rajesh Singh - Kumbhakarna

References

External links
Raavan on IMDb
Official Website
 Ravan Serial Zee TV

Indian television soap operas
Zee TV original programming
2006 Indian television series debuts
2008 Indian television series endings
Television series based on the Ramayana